BotCon, briefly known as "The Official Transformers Collectors' Convention" (or OTFCC), is an annual convention for Transformers fans and collectors. BotCon has been held annually since 1994. BotCon is a syllabic abbreviation for "Robot Convention" but also refers to "Autobot" and "Decepticon", the protagonist and antagonist robot factions in the many continuities in the Transformers franchise.

Featured BotCon guests are usually involved in the creation of Transformers media in some respect, whether as voice actors from the animated series, artists or writers from the comic books, or actual Hasbro employees. Fun Publications has held the convention for a number of years, with 2016 being its final year. It was replaced by the now defunct HasCon, Hasbro's own convention, in 2017.

History

The first BotCon was held in Fort Wayne, Indiana, United States in 1994. Organized by brothers Jon and Karl Hartman, the convention had 180 attendees. BotCon was organized in 1995 by Raksha, a prominent figure in the fan community, and in 1996 by Men In Black Productions, headed up by Dennis Barger. In 1997, the Hartmans brought Glen Hallit, a fellow fan, into the fold, forming 3H Enterprises (based on the first letter of the organizers' last names).

In 1999, BotCon Europe took place in Clapham Common, Wandsworth, South West London, England.

At BotCon 2002, Hallit announced that 3H had secured the official Transformers convention license, as well as licenses to produce comic books and start a fan club. Shortly thereafter, the Hartmans were removed from their organizational duties, leaving Glen Hallit as the sole organizer of the new company, 3H Productions, Inc.

In the winter of 2002, 3H sought to expand to Europe, holding an official European convention in Cheshunt, UK. However, the event, which was held in conjunction with the main BotCon 2002 in the US, had much less advertising and the registration did not open until a couple of weeks before the convention. Since the attendance at the European BotCon had been much smaller than the main show that summer, 3H decided it was too much work to hold two separate conventions, and officially announced that they would never hold BotCon outside the US again.

In 2003, the convention changed its name to "The Official Transformers Collectors' Convention" (OTFCC), due to the Hartmans' ownership of the BotCon service mark. The fandom held dueling conventions in 2004, as 3H held OTFCC in Chicago, Illinois, while the Hartman brothers revived the BotCon name for their final convention in Pasadena, California. That fall, 3H Productions lost all of its Transformers-related licenses, leaving the convention in a state of limbo.

In early January 2005, Hasbro announced on its official website that Fun Publications, owned by Brian Savage, had been awarded the convention and fan club licenses. The Hartman brothers and prominent fans Pete Sinclair, Benson Yee, and Rik Alvarez were invited to form an advisory council to help ease the transition of organizing the convention for the new owners. Once the Hartmans' service mark was transferred to Fun Publications, BotCon regained its status of being the official Transformers collectors' convention.

On February 2, 2020, people started to observe new activity on the official BotCon website. On February 3, 2020 Karl Hartman announced BotCon 2021. In a post on the Official BotCon Facebook page, Hartman said, "The story of BotCon is not over. It just has a new chapter. On behalf of myself, Bret Lovell, Andrew Hall and the rest of the BC Productions crew, I am honored and humbled to announce: BotCon 2021".

Over the years, BotCon has featured many individuals who have worked to bring the Transformers multiverse to life, including voice actors, animation staff, and Hasbro design team members.

BotCon returned in 2022 under new ownership (Agabyss), with a brand new convention in Nashville. The return of the convention on August 26th 2022 marks a new era for the once official transformers convention. While Transformers are still the main focus, the convention will also embrace other properties that many in the fandom already enjoy. (see botcon.com)

Transformers Hall of Fame
At the 2010 BotCon, Hasbro introduced a "Hall of Fame" awards ceremony to commemorate the people and characters of the franchise. Hasbro selected the first four robot inductees, while fans worldwide voted for the fifth. In the end, Dinobot from Beast Wars: Transformers won the votes. Among the human inductees were Bob Budiansky for helping create the franchise through comics and personality profiles, Peter Cullen for giving Optimus Prime his voice, and Hideaki Yoke and Kohjin Ohno of Takara Tomy for creating many of the franchise's toys.

For 2011, Steven Spielberg and Michael Bay were inducted for the success of the Transformers live-action film franchise.

In 2012, the first posthumous award was given to voice actor Chris Latta, who died in 1994. Wheeljack, one of the characters he voiced in the original series, was selected as the Fan's Choice recipient.

Exclusive toys
One of BotCon's most popular features is the exclusive toys made available to the attendees. The toys are different every year and are not retailed anywhere in the world. The number of exclusive toys increased significantly in 2005 after Fun Publications became the official license holder of the convention. The identities and designs of the toys were originally kept a close secret until the opening of the convention, but in the later years of the convention the organizers often chose to reveal one or more of the exclusives ahead of time due to repeated problems with stolen prototypes being sold on eBay. In 2008, organizer Brian Savage ordered all eBay users selling these prototypes to return them to their rightful owners.

Although the toys are always unique, financial costs prohibit the creation of entirely new molds. As such, the toys are redecos or repaints of previously used toys given new identities, occasionally switching allegiances and even gender. Beginning in 2003, some of the exclusives were given new, retooled heads to further differentiate the new characters from previous uses of a mold. As the number of exclusives offered at each convention grew, so did the number of retooled parts. Since then, it has been standard practice to produce three or four newly tooled heads (or other parts such as wings in the case of 2007) for each BotCon. After the convention, exclusive toys usually become valuable collector's items in the community, particularly among fans who missed the convention.

The Transformers Collector's Club also releases exclusive figures, which are also remolds and repaints of regular Transformers figures.

References

External links

Official site
Hasbro Transformers Collectors' Club
Convention info from the Transformers FAQ
Transformers conventions attendee figures and information

Transformers (franchise)
Multigenre conventions
Recurring events established in 1994
Festivals established in 1994